Dunn is an unincorporated community in southern Scurry County, Texas, United States.  It is located along State Highway 208 south of Snyder.  Dunn previously had a post office.

History
A historical marker in Dunn reads:

Climate
Climate type occurs primarily on the periphery of the true deserts in low-latitude semiarid steppe regions.   The Köppen Climate Classification subtype for this climate is BSk (Tropical and Subtropical Steppe Climate).

References

Unincorporated communities in Scurry County, Texas
Unincorporated communities in Texas